Karl Friedrich Mohr (November 4, 1806 – September 28, 1879) was a German chemist famous for his early statement of the principle of the conservation of energy. Ammonium iron(II) sulfate, (NH4)2Fe(SO4)2.6H2O, is named Mohr's salt after him.

Life

Mohr was born in 1806 into the family of a prosperous druggist in Koblenz. The young Mohr received much of his early education at home, a great part of it in his father's laboratory. This experience may be responsible for much of the skill Mohr later showed in devising instruments and methods of chemical analysis. At the age of twenty-one he began to study chemistry under Leopold Gmelin, and, after five years in Heidelberg, Berlin and Bonn, he returned with the degree of PhD to join his father's establishment.

Mohr's father died during 1840 at which time Mohr assumed control of the family business. He retired from it for a life of scientific leisure in 1857, but at the age of fifty-seven some serious financial losses caused him to become a privatdozent in Bonn. In 1859, Mohr was one of the 56 founding members of the Freies Deutsches Hochstift (Free German Foundation). In 1867 he was appointed, by the direct influence of the government, extraordinary professor of pharmacy.

Work

Mohr was the leading scientific chemist of his time in Germany, and the inventor of many improvements in analytical methodology. He invented an improved burette which had a tip at the bottom and a clamp (a 'Mohr's clip'), which made it much easier to use than its predecessors, which were more similar to a graduated cylinder. His methods of volumetric analysis were expounded in his Lehrbuch der chemisch-analytischen Titrir-methode (1855) (Instructional Book of Titration Methods in Analytical Chemistry), which won special commendation from Liebig and ran to many editions. His Geschichte der Erde, eine Geologie auf neuer Grundlage (1866) (History of the Earth, a Geology on a New Basis), was also widely circulated.

In a paper Über die Natur der Wärme (1837), Mohr gave one of the earliest general statements of the doctrine of the conservation of energy:

Selected writings 

 Lehrbuch der pharmaceutischen Technik.  Braunschweig: Friedrich Bieweg, 1847.  1866 edition digitized   This was the first textbook of pharmacy.  It was translated and adapted to English practice by Theophilus Redwood.  The US version was translated and adapted by William Procter, Jr.
 Commentar zur Preußischen Pharmacopoe nebst Übersetzung des Textes : nach der 6. Aufl. der Pharmacopoea Borussica bearbeitet ; für Apotheker, Aerzte und Medicinal-Beamte . Band 1 . Vieweg, Braunschweig 1848 Digital edition by the University and State Library Düsseldorf
 Commentar zur Preußischen Pharmacopoe nebst Übersetzung des Textes : nach der 6. Aufl. der Pharmacopoea Borussica bearbeitet ; für Apotheker, Aerzte und Medicinal-Beamte . Band 2 . Vieweg, Braunschweig 1849 Digital edition by the University and State Library Düsseldorf 
 Commentar zur preussischen Pharmacopoe nebst Übersetzung des Textes : nach der sechsten Auflage der Pharmacopoea Borussica ; für Apotheker, Ärzte und Medicinal-Beamte Vol.1-2 . Vieweg, Braunschweig 2nd ed. 1854 Digital edition by the University and State Library Düsseldorf 
 Lehrbuch der chemisch-analytischen Titriermethode : für Chemiker, Ärzte u. Pharmaceuten, Berg- und Hüttenmänner, Fabrikanten, Agronomen, Metallurgen, Münzbeamte etc. ; nach eigenen Versuchen und systematisch dargestellt . Vieweg, Braunschweig 3. Aufl. 1870 Digital edition by the University and State Library Düsseldorf
 
 - Based on Mohr's work

See also
Mohr method

References 

Attribution

Further reading 

 
 
 Mohr, K. F. (1837) "Ansichten über die Natur der Wärme." Ann. der Pharm., 24, pp. 141–147.
 Mohr, K. F. (1876) (trans. P. G. Tait) "Views of the nature of heat." Philosophical Magazine 2 110-14.
 
 See also this site for a different photograph of Mohr

19th-century German chemists
1806 births
1879 deaths
Scientists from Koblenz
German pharmacists
German scientific instrument makers
People from the Rhine Province
Founding members of the Freies Deutsches Hochstift